Kiril Dimitrov (8 December 1951 – July 2015) was a Bulgarian wrestler who competed in the 1972 Summer Olympics.

References

External links
 

1951 births
2015 deaths
Olympic wrestlers of Bulgaria
Wrestlers at the 1972 Summer Olympics
Bulgarian male sport wrestlers